R v Ghosh [1982] EWCA Crim 2 is an English criminal law case setting out a test for dishonest conduct which was relevant as to many offences worded as doing an act dishonestly, such as deception, as theft, as mainstream types of fraud, and as benefits fraud. The test has been revised to an objective test, with rare exceptions, by the Supreme Court in Ivey v Genting Casinos [2017] UKSC 67.

Facts
Dr Ghosh was a surgeon. He was convicted of four offences under the Theft Act 1968 sections 20(2) and 15(1). During his work as a locum surgeon he was paid one set of extra wages and attempted three times to obtain such wages by claiming variously: for work that others had carried out and for work reimburseable to him via the National Health Service. The jury found him guilty. He appealed on the basis that the trial judge had told the jury to use their common sense to determine whether the accused's conduct had been dishonest or not. His defence team argued that the judge should have instructed the jury that dishonesty was about the accused’s state of mind (a subjective test) rather than the jury’s point of view (an objective test).

Judgment
The Court of Appeal found that the conviction was proper so dismissed the doctor's appeal as the original direction did not lead to an unsafe or unsound conviction.

The Court began by stating (its most senior member, the Chief Justice) "The law, on this branch of the Theft Act 1968 is in a complicated state and we embark upon an examination of the authorities with great diffidence." This court reformulated the test for dishonesty. It held that,

Hence the test for dishonesty was subjective and objective. As a result, the 'Ghosh test', which the jury was required to consider before reaching a verdict on dishonesty:
Was the act one that an ordinary decent person (normally considered to be the ubiquitous 'man on the Clapham omnibus') would consider to be dishonest (the objective test)? If so:
Must the accused have realised that what he was doing was, by those standards, dishonest (the subjective test)? [This part of the test was overruled by the Supreme Court in the case of Ivey v Genting Casinos (UK) Ltd t/a Crockfords [2017] UKSC 67]

Note that it was not essential for a person to admit that they acted in a way that they knew to be dishonest; it was probably enough that they knew others would think their behaviour was dishonest, or that they thought that what they were doing was wrong.

Ivey v Genting Casinos
Ivey v Genting Casinos (UK) Ltd t/a Crockfords was a Supreme Court case decided in late 2017 which expressed the view in obiter dictum that Ghosh did not correctly represent the law, that the objective test was preferred and that the test of dishonesty is as set out by Lord Nicholls in Royal Brunei Airlines Sdn Bhd v Tan [1995] UKPC 4 and by Lord Hoffmann in Barlow Clowes International Ltd v Eurotrust International Ltd [2005] UKPC 37. When dishonesty was in question, the fact-finding tribunal must first ascertain the actual state of the individual's knowledge or belief as to the facts. The question whether the conduct was honest or dishonest was then to be determined by applying the objective standards of ordinary decent people.

The Supreme Court noted particularly that though their case concerned a cheating gambler (as they found Ivey to be) suing the casino in a civil case, there was no good reason for distinguishing civil from criminal dishonesty, and that accordingly the criminal law was incorrectly understood as set out in Ghosh.

See also
Social Security Administration Act 1992

Notes and references
Notes

References

External links
Full text of Ghosh judgment from Bailii
Full text of Ivey v Genting judgment from Bailii
Ghosh discussion The 'Ghosh test' of dishonesty

English criminal case law
1982 in England
1982 in case law
1982 in British law